Belle Mead station is a train station along the CSX Trenton Subdivision and former New Jersey Transit West Trenton Line in the Belle Mead section of Montgomery Township, in Somerset County, New Jersey, United States.

History
The current station was built by the Reading Railroad, opening to the public on December 8, 1919. This replaced the older station which was built in the late 19th century. The current Belle Mead station was closed in 1981 and is still standing. New Jersey Transit may reopen the station as part of the proposed revival of the West Trenton Line. This station was expected to have the second largest ridership on the branch with 290 daily passengers. If the station were to be reopened, two small station buildings would be renovated. Commuter parking would possibly be located on the eastside of the right-of-way with access from Route 206 with 300 parking spaces. The intersection of Township Line Road and Route 206 would be improved along with replacement of the adjacent Route 206 bridge over the railroad.

Preservation New Jersey declared it one of the most endangered buildings in the state in 2019.

References

Montgomery Township, New Jersey
Proposed NJ Transit rail stations
Former railway stations in New Jersey
Former Reading Company stations
Former SEPTA Regional Rail stations
Railway stations closed in 1982